The Philippine House Committee on People Participation, or House People Participation Committee is a standing committee of the Philippine House of Representatives.

Jurisdiction 
As prescribed by House Rules, the committee's jurisdiction includes the following:
 Role, rights and responsibilities of people's organizations, non-government and civic organizations, and other similar groups
 Establishment of mechanisms for consultation with and participation of the people in governance and in legislation including the establishment and maintenance of a data bank on all such organizations

Members, 18th Congress

See also 
 House of Representatives of the Philippines
 List of Philippine House of Representatives committees

References

External links 
House of Representatives of the Philippines

People Participation